The superficial perineal pouch (also superficial perineal compartment/space/sac) is a compartment of the perineum.

Structure
The superficial perineal pouch is an open compartment, due to the fact that anteriorly, the space communicates freely with the potential space lying between the superficial fascia of the anterior abdominal wall and the anterior abdominal muscles:
 its inferior border is the fascia of Colles, the deeper membranous layer of the superficial perineal fascia that covers the inferior border of the muscles of the superficial perineal pouch. (The fascia of perineum is a deep fascia that  covers the superficial perineal muscles individually). 
 its superior border is the perineal membrane (inferior fascia of the urogenital diaphragm).

Contents
 Muscles
 Ischiocavernosus muscle
 Bulbospongiosus muscle
 Superficial transverse perineal muscle
 Erectile bodies
 Corpus cavernosum (of penis and of clitoris)
 Corpus spongiosum (of penis)
 Vessels
 Posterior scrotal arteries (males)/Labial arteries (females)
 Artery to bulb (males)/vestibule (females)
 Urethral artery
Nerves
Posterior scrotal nerves (males)/Posterior Labial nerves(females)
 Other
 Crura of penis (males) / Crura of clitoris (females)
 Bulb of penis (males) / Bulb of vestibule (females)
 Bartholin's glands (female)
 Spongy urethra contained in the corpus spongiosum

Additional images

See also
 Deep perineal pouch

References

External links
  - "The Female Perineum: The Superficial Perineal Pouch"
 

Perineum